The Thurwieserspitze is a mountain in the Ortler Alps on the border between South Tyrol and the Province of Sondrio, Italy.

References 

 Peter Holl: Alpenvereinsführer Ortleralpen, 9. Auflage, München 2003, 
 Zeitschrift des Deutschen und Oesterreichischen Alpenvereins, Band I, Seite 42, Wien 1869
 Wilhelm Hammer: Sammlung geologischer Führer, Band 22, Gebrüder Borntraeger, Berlin 1922
 Casa Editrice Tabacco, Udine: Carta topografica 1:25.000, Blatt 08, Ortles-Cevedale/Ortlergebiet

External links 

Mountains of the Alps
Mountains of South Tyrol
Alpine three-thousanders
Ortler Alps